Inamorata is the Latin word for a person's female lover. It may also refer to:

 Inamorata (album), an album by Poco
 Inamorata (novel), a 2004 novel by Joseph Gangemi
 Inamorata (brand), a 2017 apparel brand
 "Inamorata", a song by Animals as Leaders from their self-titled debut album, 2009
 "Inamorata", a song by Northlane from Obsidian, 2022

See also
 Innamorata (disambiguation)